Munmun Dhalaria is a documentary filmmaker from Dharamshala, currently based in Bangalore India. She is known for making documentaries on wildlife conservation, gender and human rights. Her films have been broadcast on networks like National Geographic, Hotstar and Vice World News. Since 2017, Dhalaria has been associated with the National Geographic Society as a National Geographic Explorer. Her photographs have been published internationally in various scientific journals and magazines like National Geographic Magazine.

She is also a Hatha Yoga teacher.

Early life and education 

Munmun is the daughter of (retd.) Gp. Capt. Jagdish Chand Dhalaria, officer with the Indian Air Force. She belongs to a small hamlet called Gahra in Mandi district of Himachal Pradesh in Western Himalaya. Her mother Manjula Dhalaria belongs to Hamirpur district and primarily grew up in Shimla, the capital of Himachal Pradesh. She grew up with one sibling- her elder brother Rishabh Dhalaria, who is a manager at Bank of Baroda.

She studied in several Air Force schools and Kendriya Vidyalayas at different places in India owing to her fathers’ job. During her high school at Kendriya Vidyalaya, Yelahanka, Bangalore she was selected for AFS foreign exchange program in Massachusetts, US, which involved in radio telemetry research on coy apart from her other high school activities. Dhalaria has done her bachelor's degree in mass media and mass communication from Delhi University and MA in media and cultural studies from Tata Institute of Social Sciences, She has also done her Basic Mountaineering Course with the Indian Army.

Filmography

References

Living people
Indian women documentary filmmakers
People from Dharamshala
Film directors from Bangalore
Delhi University alumni
Tata Institute of Social Sciences alumni
1991 births